James Ernest Palmer (19 December 1877 – 3 February 1947) was an  Australian rules footballer who played with Geelong in the Victorian Football League (VFL).

Family
The son of John Charles Palmer (1852-1945), and Elizabeth Levesque Palmer (1855-1901), née Dickson, James Ernest Palmer was born on 19 December 1877.

Death
He died on 3 February 1947.

Notes

External links 

1877 births
1947 deaths
Australian rules footballers from Geelong
Geelong Football Club players
Newtown Football Club players